Rudic is a surname. Notable people with the surname include:

Laurance Rudic (born 1952), British theatre artist
Steven Rudic (born 1976), Australian boxer, martial artist, and model
Valeriu Rudic (born 1947), Moldovan scientist

See also
Rudić, Serbo-Croatian surname